Aghuz Koti (also Romanized as Āghūz Kotī; also known as Āghūzdār Kolūm) is a village in Baladeh Rural District, Khorramabad District, Tonekabon County, Mazandaran Province, Iran. At the 2006 census, its population was 144, in 37 families.

References 

Populated places in Tonekabon County